José Guardiola Díaz de Rada, (22 October 1930 – 9 April 2012) was a Spanish singer of popular music who sang in Spanish and Catalan.

Guardiola was born in Barcelona. He performed and recorded mostly Spanish versions of foreign songs and reached his maximum fame in Spain and Latin America in the early 1960s with versions of songs like "Sixteen Tons", "Mack the Knife" and "Ya Mustafa". He was known as the Spanish Crooner due to his style and the types of songs he sang.  He represented Spain in the Eurovision Song Contest 1963, placing 12th. At that time he also sang a few songs with his infant daughter. He retired in 2008.

Discography
 Navidad EP with the Hermanas Serrano

References

 "José Guardiola recibe un homenaje por sus 80 años" (Spanish), 14 December 2009, by Juan Soto Vinolo, El Periodico.

1930 births
Eurovision Song Contest entrants for Spain
Eurovision Song Contest entrants of 1963
2012 deaths
20th-century Spanish musicians
20th-century Spanish male singers
20th-century Spanish singers